Georg August Zinn (27 May 1901 – 27 March 1976) was a German lawyer and a politician of the SPD. He was a member of the Bundestag from 1949 to 1951 representing Kassel, the 2nd Minister-President of Hesse from 1950 to 1969 and served as the 5th and 16th President of the Bundesrat in 1953/54 and 1964/65.

While he was at the helm of Hesse government he played an important role, although quite discretely, in the capture of Nazi criminal Adolf Eichmann. In Isser Harel book's introduction by Shlomo J. Shpiro, added to the 1997 expanded edition, it is revealed for the first time that then Hesse prosecutor-general Fritz Bauer did not act alone, in the attempt to apprehend Eichmann while he was hiding in Argentina, but was discretely helped by Zinn.

Zinn was two times married. His second wife was Dr. Christa Zinn (1927–2002). Three sons are still living, Karl Georg Zinn (born 1939, economist), Dr. Georg-Christian Zinn and Dr. Philip-André Zinn.

He was born in Frankfurt and died in Frankfurt.

References

External links 
 

1901 births
1976 deaths
Presidents of the German Bundesrat
Jurists from Frankfurt
Grand Crosses 1st class of the Order of Merit of the Federal Republic of Germany
Ministers-President of Hesse
Members of the Bundestag for Hesse
Members of the Bundestag for the Social Democratic Party of Germany
Politicians from Frankfurt